The Shadow Near the Pier is a 1955 Soviet drama film directed by Mikhail Vinyarsky.

Plot 
In a seaside city, a saboteur with a plan of a floating dock, ready for towing to a remote port, is detained. Major Lyudov of State Security has to untangle the ball of connections between the detainee and a group of saboteurs operating in the city and ensure the timely dispatch of the dock.

Cast
 Oleg Zhakov as Major Lyudov	
 Raisa Matyushkina as Tatyana Rakitina
 Oleg Tumanov as Sergey Ageyev
 Ekaterina Savinova as 	waitress Klava Shubina
 Vladimir Balashov as Kobchikov
 Viktor Kulakov as Semyon
 Lev Olevsky as Colonel Rysley

Release 
In a list of the highest-grossing films of the USSR, this film takes 400th place with 29.4 million spectators.

References

External links 
 

1955 films
1950s Russian-language films
1950s spy drama films
Odesa Film Studio films
Soviet spy drama films
Soviet black-and-white films